Cryptoses waagei is a species of snout moth in the genus Cryptoses. It was described by John David Bradley in 1982 and is found in Brazil.

References

Moths described in 1982
Chrysauginae
Coprophagous insects